The 1984 Amílcar Cabral Cup was held in Freetown, Sierra Leone.

Group stage

Group A

Group B

It is unknown why Mali was placed second over Guinea-Bissau, as all possible tie-breakers (e.g. goals scored, head-to-head) are for Guinea-Bissau's favor.

Knockout stage

Semi-finals

Third place match

Final

References
RSSSF archives

Amílcar Cabral Cup